Myopites zernyi is a species of tephritid or fruit flies in the genus Myopites of the family Tephritidae.

Distribution
Greece, Croatia.

References

Tephritinae
Insects described in 1939
Diptera of Europe